Chervonohrad urban hromada is an urban hromada (municipality) located in Ukraine's western Lviv Oblast, in Chervonohrad Raion. Its administrative centre is the city of Chervonohrad.

The population of the hromada is 

Until 18 July 2020, Chervonohrad was designated as a city of oblast significance. As part of the administrative reform of Ukraine, which reduced the number of raions of Lviv Oblast to seven, Chervonohrad was merged into newly established Chervonohrad Raion. Before being abolished, Chervonohrad's municipality also included the city of Sosnivka (until 2019) and the urban-type settlement of Hirnyk.

Settlements 
In addition to two cities (Chervonohrad and Sosnivka) and one urban-type settlement (Hirnyk), Chervonohrad urban hromada includes the following 11 villages:

References 

2020 establishments in Ukraine
Hromadas of Lviv Oblast